The Nigerian Navy (NN) is a branch of the Nigerian Armed Forces. It is among the largest navies on the African continent, consisting of 25,000 personnels as at 2021. It's motto is "Onward Together".

History
The Nigerian Navy owes its origin to the Nigerian Marine. Formed in 1914 after the amalgamation of the then Northern and Southern Nigeria, the Nigerian Marine, as it became known after 1914, was a quasi-military organization. This force expanded to become the Southern Nigerian Marine in 1893. A Northern Nigeria equivalent was formed in 1900. The two Marines were merged in 1914. Responsibilities included administration of the ports and harbours, dredging of channels, buoyage and lighting. It also operated ferry services, touring launches, and other small craft that plied the various creeks and other inland waterways.

The first of these new organizations was the Nigerian Ports Authority, which was charged with the running of ports and ensuring safe navigation. The second organisation was the Inland Waterways Department, which took over the running of ferries and touring launches. The third organisation was the Nigerian Naval Force, made up mostly of reserve Royal Navy officers and ex-Service personnel who had been transferred to the Nigerian Ports Authority from the defunct Nigerian Marine. Its primary responsibility was to train the personnel and set up the appropriate infrastructure necessary for the planned Navy. The first basic training establishment for the future Navy—the HMNS Quorra—was started on 1 November 1957 with 60 junior ratings, who underwent a 6-month basic seamanship course.

In July 1959, the Nigerian Naval Force was transformed into a full-fledged Navy when Queen Elizabeth II granted permission for it to use the title "Royal Nigerian Navy". The title was changed to the "Nigerian Navy" in 1963 after Nigeria became a republic. The constitutional task of the Navy was expanded in 1964 after the repeal of the 1958 Ordinance. The new law, known as the Navy Act of 1964, for the first time tasked the Navy with the "naval defence of Nigeria". Other tasks assigned to the Navy by the 1964 Act were essentially coast guard duties, namely assisting in the enforcement of customs laws, making hydrographic surveys, and training officers and men in naval duties.

These tasks were essentially routine functions of any navy. Consequently, the naval leadership began to mount pressure on the political leadership to re-define the constitutional role of the navy. In 1993, this pressure yielded the desired result and under a new law, Armed Forces Decree 105 (now known as the Armed Forces Act), was incorporated as part of the 1999 Constitution. The Nigerian Navy was given expanded military and constabulary roles, especially in the oil and gas sectors of the Nigerian maritime economy.

Command structure
The NN is currently structured into 9 Branches at the Naval Headquarters, 5 commands and a number of autonomous units. The 5 commands are made up of 3 operational commands – Western Naval Command, Central Naval Command and Eastern Naval Command with headquarters located at Apapa, Yenagoa and Calabar- as well as the Training and Logistics Commands with headquarters at Apapa and Oghara respectively. Each of the 5 commands is headed by a Flag Officer of the rank of Rear Admiral. The NN autonomous units include:

 Naval Ordnance Depot (NOD)
 Naval Doctrine and Assessment Centre (NDAC)
 Navy Holdings Limited (NHL) and 9 subsidiary companies.
 Naval Dockyard Limited (NDL)
 Naval Shipyard Limited (NSYL)
 Naval Building & Construction Company Limited (NBCCL)
 Navy Hotels & Suites Limited (NHSL)
 Navy Micro Finance Bank Limited (NMFBL),
 Navy Maritime Services Limited (NMSL)
 Naval Exchange (NAVEX)
 Naval Engineering Services Limited (NESL)
 Navy Clearing and Forwarding Services Limited (NCFSL). 
 The autonomous units and support facilities enable the NN to maintain the fleet and personnel for sustained operations. The NN has also, recently, established a Project Implementation, Monitoring and Evaluation Directorate at the NHQ for better management of NN projects.

Naval Headquarters

The Naval Headquarters is the administrative and policy-making organ of the Nigerian Navy. At its head is the Chief of the Naval Staff, who exercises full command of the Nigerian Navy. The Chief of Naval Staff has seven staff branches in addition to the Office of the Navy Secretary. The branches are: Policy and Plans, Training and Operations, Administration, Naval Engineering, Logistics, Accounts and Budget, and Safety and Standards. These branches are headed by Principal Staff Officers of flag rank.

Chief of the Naval Staff

The Chief of the Naval Staff is the highest ranking military officer of the Nigerian Navy.
The position is often occupied by the most senior commissioned officer appointed by the Commander-in-Chief of the Armed Forces of Nigeria.The Chief of the Naval Staff reports to the Chief of Defence Staff, who also reports to the Defence Minister.
The Statutory duty of the Officer is to formulate and execute policies towards the highest attainment of National Security and operational competence of the Nigerian Navy.
The current Chief of Naval Staff is Vice Admiral Awwal Zubairu Gambo, who was appointed on 26 January 2021, by President Muhammadu Buhari to succeed Ibok Ekwe Ibas.

Directly under the Naval Headquarters are three operational commands (Western Naval Command, Eastern Naval Command, and Central Naval Command), one training command, one logistics command, and several autonomous units.

Western Naval Command
The Western Naval Command Headquarters is located at Apapa in Lagos. It covers the sea and coastal areas from the Nigeria/Benin border at Long 002o 49’ E to Long 005o E in Delta State, from the Nigerian coastline to the limit of the nation's exclusive economic zone. The command has the following units under its jurisdiction:

 Headquarters, Western Naval Command
 Western Fleet at Apapa.
 NNS Beecroft, an operations base at Apapa.
 Naval Air Base, Ojo, Lagos.
 Nigerian Navy Reference Hospital, Ojo, Lagos.
 Fleet Support Group (West) at Apapa.
 NNS WEY, a maintenance unit at Navy Town, Ojo.
 Forward Operating Bases Igbokoda and Badagary in Ondo and Lagos states, respectively.
 Nigerian Navy Secondary School, Abeokuta.
 Nigerian Navy Secondary School, Ojo.
 Nigerian Navy Secondary School, Ogbomoso.
 Nigerian Navy Secondary School, Imeri, Ondo State.

The Western Naval Command Also maintains presence at Tongegi Island in Ondo State.

The Western Command is headed by a Flag Officer Commanding who is of the rank of Rear Admiral. The previous Flag Officers Commanding are Rear Admiral RO Osondu, Rear Admiral FD Bobai, Rear Admiral SAG Abbah, Rear Admiral OH Ngalabak., Rear Admiral Oladele Bamidele Daji and Rear Admiral Barabutemegha Jason Gbassa. The current Flag officer commanding is Rear Admiral Yakubu Bala Wambai.

Eastern Naval Command
The Eastern Naval Command is the second operations command of the Nigerian Navy and covers the sea area from Long 006o 30'E in Delta State to the Nigeria/Cameroon border at Long 008o 30’ E, and from the Nigerian coastline to the limit of the nation's exclusive economic zone. The headquarters is at Calabar. The Command has the following units under its jurisdiction:

 NNS Victory, an operations base at Calabar.
 NNS Pathfinder, an operations base at Port Harcourt.
 NNS Jubilee, an operations base at Ikot Abasi.
 Eastern Fleet at Calabar.
 Naval Air Station, Calabar (to be constructed)
 Forward Operating Bases Bonny and Ibaka in Rivers and Akwa Ibom States respectively.
 Naval Outpost at Ikuru in Rivers State.
 Fleet Support Group (East) at Calabar.
 Navy Hospitals at Calabar and Port Harcourt.
 Nigerian Navy Secondary Schools at Calabar and Port Harcourt.
 Nigerian Navy Reference Hospital Calabar.

Central Naval Command
The Central Naval Command is the third operations command of the Nigerian Navy. The headquarters is in Yenagoa in Bayelsa State. Its area of responsibility stretches from the Benin River entrance (Long 0050 00'E) to the Santa Barbara River entrance (Long 0060 30'E), encompassing the coastal states of Bayelsa, Delta, and Edo, and the landward states, including Kogi.

The command has the following units under its jurisdiction:
NNS Delta, an operations base in Warri, Delta State
Naval Air Station, Effurun-Warri, Delta State
Navy Hospital, Warri, Delta State
Forward Operating Bases Escravos and Formoso in Delta and Bayelsa states, respectively.
NNS Lugard, an inland operations base on the River Niger at Lokoja, Kogi State.
Naval Outposts at Idah and Onitsha in Kogi and Anambra States respectively.
Nigerian Navy Secondary School Okura-Olafia, Kogi State
Onward Together from the right*

Naval Training Command 
The main functions of the Naval Training Command are the coordination and harmonization of training doctrines and standards for all local training in the Nigerian Navy, as evolved by the Naval Headquarters. The Command is headed by the Flag Officer Commanding, who is assisted by nine principal staff officers, namely: the Command Staff Officer, the Command Technical Training Officer, Command Logistic Training Officer, and Command Medical Training Officer. Others are the Command Academic Training Officer, CABO, CAO, CINTO and CPM. The units under the Naval Training Command are:

 Sea Training Unit at Victoria Island, Lagos. It is responsible for Basic Operations Sea Training, Safety Operations Sea Training, and Consolidated Operations Sea Training of all Nigerian Navy ships when assigned. It also conducts harbour and ship acceptance trials of vessels after major refits.
 NNS Quorra at Apapa, which provides various professional courses for officers and ratings.
 Nigerian Naval Engineering College (NNEC) Sapele, which provides technical training for all Nigerian Navy technical personnel.
 The Nigerian Navy Finance and Logistic College at Owerrinta.
 Nigerian Naval College and the Nigerian Navy Basic Training School, which are co-located at Onne, Port Harcourt. The two establishments conduct basic training for officers and ratings respectively.
 Other professional schools, including the Nigerian Navy College of Health Sciences at Offa in Kwara State and the Nigerian Navy School of Music Ota in Ogun State, and the Hydrographic School in Port Harcourt, the Naval Provost and Regulating School in Benue State, the Nigerian Navy School of Armament Technology, The Nigerian Navy Center of Education Training and Technology and the Physical Training School, both at Apapa, Lagos.

Logistics Command
The Logistics Command is headed by a Flag Officers Commanding of Rear Admiral rank. The permanent headquarters is at Oghara, Delta State. However, the Nigerian Navy Order establishing the Logistics Command has been released and the command has since started operation. The order stipulates the organization and responsibilities of the command.

Autonomous units
The autonomous units are those units which require prudent management and high-level control that need not be duplicated or represented at the lower hierarchy. Though small in size, they report directly to the Chief of the Naval Staff. Prominent among the autonomous units is the Nigerian Naval Dockyard, located in Victoria Island, Lagos. Hitherto, third line maintenance had been carried out either in foreign dockyards or private ones in Nigeria, at very high cost. The Naval Dockyard in Lagos, which was commissioned on 27 August 1990, now takes care of high level maintenance, such as major overhaul of ships engines, additions and alterations, and modification of designs. The Naval Shipyard in Port Harcourt was also acquired in 1990 from Messrs Witt and Bush. Smaller ships of the Nigerian Navy and merchant ships are repaired there. The shipyard has built and delivered some tugboats and barges to some private organizations.

Nigerian Navy Air Arm
The 101 Squadron was established in 1985, based at Navytown, near Ojo. It operated AgustaWestland Lynx helicopters for anti-submarine warfare and search and rescue (SAR) operations from the Meko class frigate NNS Aradu. For quite some time, the Squadron has operated Agusta 109 Helicopters from Warri Naval Base on anti-smuggling and oil protection duties.

Organization on Nigerian Navy ships
There are four main departments on Nigerian Navy ships. These are operations, marine engineering, weapon engineering, and logistics. An officer, who is referred to as the head of department, is in charge of each department. He reports directly to the commanding officer on operational matters or through the Executive Officer on all administrative matters. The Executive Officer is the second in command on all naval ships, as well as being the head of the Operations Department on smaller ships. On larger ships the Executive Officer remains the second in command, but the Principal Warfare Officer is the leg of the Operations Department. In the ratings cadre, the most senior seaman rating is referred to as the Coxswain. The Coxswain (E.M.T) more like M.P, is responsible for organizing the ratings for work and discipline.

Special Boat Service
The Special Boat Service is a special operations unit of the Nigerian Navy. It is a male only outfit fashioned after the Royal Navy's Special Boat Service. It is predominantly focused on, but not restricted to; littoral and riverine operations, including reconnaissance and surveillance; covert beach reconnaissance in advance of an amphibious assault; recovery or protection of ships and oil installations subject to hostile state or non-state action; maritime counter-terrorism; and offensive action.

On 21 April 2020, ten SBS commandos boarded the  Tommi Ritscher, a container ship captured by pirates off the shore of Benin.  Benin authorities gave the SBS commandos a letter of commendation.

Nigerian Navy fleet revitalization 
On 3 September 2018, in an official ceremony held at the Naval Dockard in Lagos, the Nigerian Navy commissioned six new Ocea fast patrol boats and ten new small boats. The patrol boats include two FPB 110 MKII hulls – Nguru (P 187) and Ekulu (P 188) delivered earlier this year by France's Ocea Shipbuilding company – and four smaller FPB 72 MKII hulls – Shiroro (P 185), Ose (P 186), Gongola (P 189), and Calabar (P 190). All vessels were delivered between late 2017 and April 2018.

The six new Ocea fast patrol boats came on the heels of a Two new Ocea FPB 110 MK II Fast Patrol Boats delivered  to the Nigerian Navy. Ocea has previously delivered 7 units of the FPB 72 MK II boats in three batches: three in 2012, one FPB 98 in 2013, two in 2017 and two in January of this year. The FPB 72 and FPB 98 were ordered by the Nigerian Port Authority but handed over to the Nigerian Navy.

On October, Paramount Maritime Holding, a South African-based defense company revealed that the Nigerian Navy has placed an order for 15 new build Rigid Hull Inflatable Boats (RHIB). The order which comprises 8.5 metre and 9.5 metre Guardian fast patrol boats amongst others would also includes training for the Nigerian Navy and maritime personnel.

On 8 September 2018, the Nigerian Maritime Administration and Safety Agency handed over its AgustaWestland AW139 Search and Rescue helicopter to the Nigerian Navy.

On 10 December 2021, Nigeria's President Muhammadu Buhari commissioned 118 newly acquired ships and boats, including a helicopter, as part of his administration's drive to boost the capacity of the Nigerian Navy.

Equipment

Frigates
The Nigerian Navy possesses one MEKO 360 Type H1 frigate, NNS Aradu, which just completed a refit in 2020 and now awaits for a new role as a combat training ship for Nigeria's plan to buy new frigates.

Nigeria's mid- and long-term acquisition plans aim to fill some of these capability gaps. For example, the keel for a Damen LST-100 class landing ship for amphibious operations and force projection has been laid.

Offshore patrol vessels

Fast attack craft / Patrol boats

Patrol buoy Tenders

Inshore patrol craft

Minesweepers

Amphibious warfare ships

Auxiliary vessels

Aircraft

.

References 
48. Nigerian Navy Shortlisted Candidates. Edustuff. Retrieved 18 March 2021.

External links
 
 Nigerian Navy e-Recruitment website
 Nigerian Navy recruitment requirements

 
1958 establishments in Nigeria
Military units and formations established in 1958
Defence agencies of Nigeria